Richard Pilbrow (born 28 April 1933 in Beckenham, Kent, England) is a stage lighting designer, author, theatre design consultant, and theatrical producer, film producer and television producer. He was the first British lighting designer to light a Broadway musical on the Broadway stage with the musical Zorba.

Early life
In the 1950s, Pilbrow entered the Central School of Speech and Drama in London as a stage management student after serving two years in the Royal Air Force.

Career
In 1957, Pilbrow co-founded the lighting rental company Theatre Projects with Bryan Kendall, which expanded to include a production company in 1963 to produce and mount the London production of A Funny Thing Happened On the Way to the Forum with set designer Tony Walton and American Producer Hal Prince.  In 1963 Pilbrow became lighting director to Laurence Olivier for the National Theatre at Chichester and the Old Vic Theatre. From 1966 he joined the National Theatre Building Committee and the following year was appointed theatre consultant to the new National Theatre on the South Bank. He was responsible for the stage design, backstage planning and all the performance equipment design (with Richard Brett) of the Olivier and Lyttelton Theatres. Theatre Projects Consultants, with Iain Mackintosh, was responsible for the design of the Cottesloe (now Dorfman) Theatre. Theatre Projects Consultants, which designs theatres and performing arts buildings, has gone on to design world-renowned spaces such as the Steppenwolf Theatre in Chicago, the Kimmel Center for the Performing Arts in Philadelphia, and the Walt Disney Concert Hall in Los Angeles, on which he wrote a book. Pilbrow is now chairman Emeritus of the firm.
Pilbrow was one of the four founders of 69 Theatre Company, at Manchester's University Theatre, along with Caspar Wrede, Michael Elliott and Braham Murray.
Pilbrow worked on Broadway for the first time as the projection designer, with lighting designer Jean Rosenthal of Prince's A Funny Thing Happened on the Way to the Forum.  A year later, his second projection assignment on Broadway with Golden Boy allowed him to work with lighting designer Tharon Musser.  Also in 1964, Pilbrow and Robert Ornbo were the first English lighting designers to ever be invited to join the United Scenic Artists.  Pilbrow went on to light eleven Broadway shows—earning Tony nominations for Four Baboons Adoring the Sun and The Life.

In 1970, he published the book Stage Lighting Design: The Art, The Craft, The Life which is still a standard textbook in lighting programs in both America and Britain.  A new edition of the book was published in September 2008. In 2011 his autobiographical account "A Theatre Project — A Backstage Story" was published.

In 1974 he produced the film Swallows and Amazons.

Pillbrow was the lighting designer for the 2008 Jill Santoriello musical adaptation of A Tale of Two Cities at the Al Hirschfeld Theatre on Broadway. He won the 1995 Drama Desk Award for Outstanding Lighting Design for Show Boat and was nominated for the same award for A Tale of Two Cities in 2009.

National Life Stories conducted an oral history interview (C1173/06) with Hudson in 2006 for its An Oral History of Theatre Design collection held by the British Library.

Pilbrow is a joint founder in the Association of British Theatre Technicians, Society of Theatre Consultants, The Society of British Theatre Designers, and the Association of Lighting Designers.  Pilbrow served two terms on the United States Institute for Theatre Technology's (USITT) Directors at Large and was also elected a Fellow of the Institute in 2001. He is a Fellow of the Hong Kong Academy for the Performing Arts and London's Central School of Speech and Drama.

Awards

Drama Desk Award Show Boat (1997)
Outer Critics Award Show Boat (1997)
Dora Award Show Boat (1997)
NAACP Award for Lighting Show Boat (1997)
Theatre Crafts International Lighting Product of the Year (1998)
Distinguished Lifetime Achievement Award in Lighting Design from the United States Institute for Theatre Technology (1999)
Association of British Theatre Technicians Technician of the Year (2000)
Lighting Designer of the Year by Lighting Dimensions Magazine (2005)
The Wally Russell Foundation Wally Russell Lifetime Achievement Award (2008)

Publications

Stage Lighting (1970)
Walt Disney Concert Hall: The Backstage Story (2003)
Stage Lighting Design: The Art, The Craft, The Life (1997 & 2008)
A Theatre Project (2011)

Broadway lighting design credits
A Tale of Two Cities (2008)
Our Town (2002)
The Life (1997)
Show Boat (1994)
Tango Pasión (1993)
Four Baboons Adoring the Sun (1992)
Shelter (1973)
The Rothschilds (1970)
Zorba (1968)
Rosencrantz and Guildenstern Are Dead (1967)
Golden Boy (1964)

Theatre projects consultants: theatre design consulting projects of note
Partial list of projects.
Kauffman Performing Arts Center, Kansas City, Missouri http://www.kauffmancenter.org
Dallas Center for the Performing Arts, Dallas, Texas
Walt Disney Concert Hall, Los Angeles, California
Richard B. Fisher Center for the Arts, Bard College Annandale-on-Hudson, New York
New Amsterdam Theater renovation, New York City
Kimmel Center for the Performing Arts, Philadelphia, Pennsylvania
Geary Theater renovation, San Francisco, California
Seiji Ozawa Hall, Tanglewood Lenox, Massachusetts
Cerritos Center for the Performing Arts, Cerritos, California
San Jose Repertory Theatre, San Jose, California
Epcor Centre for the Performing Arts, Calgary, Alberta, Canada
Portland Center for the Performing Arts, Portland, Oregon
North Carolina Blumenthal Performing Arts Center, Charlotte, North Carolina
Steppenwolf Theater, Chicago, Illinois
Chicago Shakespeare Theater, Chicago, Illinois
The Goodman Theatre, Chicago, Illinois

References

External links
Theatre Projects Consultants

1933 births
Dora Mavor Moore Award winners
Drama Desk Award winners
Lighting designers
People from Beckenham
British theatre managers and producers
Living people